XHZCM-FM is a radio station in Cozumel, Quintana Roo. It broadcasts on 107.7 MHz and is known as "Radio 107.7 FM, La Voz del Caribe".

History
The permit for 107.7 FM was issued on August 1, 2012 for Cozumel's second FM radio station, behind XHRB-FM.

The station is co-owned with local TV station XHCOZ-TV channel 5/cable 25 and 135.

References

Radio stations in Quintana Roo
Cozumel